Abhimaanam is a 1975 Indian Malayalam-language film, directed by J. Sasikumar and produced by R. S. Prabhu. The film stars Prem Nazir, Sharada, Sukumari and Kaviyoor Ponnamma. The film has musical score by A. T. Ummer.

Cast
 
Prem Nazir as Murali
Sharada as Indu 
Sukumari as Leelamani
Kaviyoor Ponnamma as Kamalamma
Adoor Bhasi as Appukuttan Nair
Thikkurissy Sukumaran Nair as Karunakaran Nair
Manavalan Joseph as Haridas 
Sankaradi as Damodharan Nair
Shobha as Geetha
Sreelatha Namboothiri as Jayanthy
C. A. Balan
Kedamangalam Ali as Venkideshwara Iyyer
M. G. Soman as Venugopal
Mallika Sukumaran 
Meena  as Chandrika
Pala Thankam as Teacher
Paravoor Bharathan as Murali's Uncle
S. P. Pillai as Vasu Pilla 
Thrissur Rajan
Master Raghu as Madhu
Baby Sumathi as Latha
T. P. Madhavan as Birthday party guest
Vanchiyoor Radha as House maid

Soundtrack
The music was composed by A. T. Ummer.

References

External links
 

1975 films
1970s Malayalam-language films
Malayalam remakes of Telugu films